Rosalind Lloyd (born 25 March 1953) is a British film and television actress. She is the daughter of film producer Euan Lloyd and actress Jane Hylton.

She released 45rpm recordings in the early 1970's on the  Phoenix and Cambrian labels. One of which was 'Hen Gyfrinach', ('The Old Secret'), and 'O Ma'er Wawr Ar Dodd', ('Oh, the Dawn is Coming'), on Cambrian CSP718.

Her film credits include:The Rivals, The Wild Geese (1978), Inseminoid (1981) and Who Dares Wins (1982). Her television appearances include: The Rivals of Sherlock Holmes, (as Lucy), Doctor Who (in the serial The Pirate Planet), Within These Walls, and Only Fools and Horses in the 1982 Christmas Special "Diamonds Are for Heather", Minder and Bergerac.  She appeared as Rachel in The Optimist episode 'The Fool of the House of Esher', which was nominated for the Golden Rose of Montreux award of 1985.

Filmography

Film

Television

References

External links

English film actresses
English television actresses
Living people
1953 births
Place of birth missing (living people)